is a former Japanese international table tennis player.

Table tennis career
She won a three bronze medals at the 1973 World Table Tennis Championships and 1975 World Table Tennis Championships; two in the Corbillon Cup (women's team event) and one in the women's doubles with Yukie Ozeki. Two years later she won a silver medal at the 1977 World Table Tennis Championships in the mixed doubles with Tokio Tasaka.

She is now a representative of the Japanese Table Tennis Association.

See also
 List of table tennis players
 List of World Table Tennis Championships medalists

References

Japanese female table tennis players
World Table Tennis Championships medalists